Rank comparison chart of armies/land forces of Commonwealth of Nations states.

Officers

Notes

References

See also
Comparative army officer ranks of the Americas
Ranks and insignia of NATO armies officers

 
Military comparisons